Grigoryev (masculine) or Grigoryeva (feminine) is a Russian surname mostly common in Russia and Ukraine. It is derived from the Latinized Greek name Gregory (Grigorios). Alternative spellings of this last name include Grigoriev (masculine) and Grigorieva (feminine).

Notable people with that name include the following:

A
Afanasy Grigoriev (1782–1868), Russian architect
Alexander Grigoriev (disambiguation)
Andrey Aleksandrovich Grigoryev, (1883–1968) Russian geographer
Apollon Grigoryev (1822–1864), Russian poet, literary critic, and translator
Artem Grigoriev, Russian figure skater

B
Boris Grigoriev (1886–1939), Russian painter and graphic artist

D
Dima Grigoriev (born 1954), Russian mathematician

E
Ellina Grigorieva, Russian-American mathematician

I
Igor Grigoriev (born 1950), Russian composer and improvisational guitarist
Ivan Grigoryev (born 1996), Russian association football player

K
Kate Grigorieva (born 1988), Russian fashion model and former Victoria's Secret Angel

L
Lidiya Grigoryeva (born 1974), Russian long-distance runner

M
Maia Grigoryevna Sandu, current President of Moldova
Maksim Grigoryev (disambiguation), several people
Mikhail Grigoryev (born 1991), Russian professional ice hockey player

N
Nataliya Grygoryeva (hurdler) (born 1962), Russian runner and hurdler
Nataliya Grigoryeva (rower) (born 1965), Russian rower
Nikifor Grigoriev (1885–1919), military leader in Ukraine during the Russian Civil War
Nikolai Grigoriev (1822–1886), member of the Petrashevsky Circle
Nikolay Grigoriev (1895–1938), Russian chess player and endgame study composer

O
Oksana Grigorieva (born 1970), Russian musician
Oleg Grigoriev (1943–1992), Russian poet

P
Pyotr Grigoryev (1899–1942), Soviet association football player

S
Semyon Grigoryev (born 1960), Soviet and Russian diplomat
Sergey Grigoryev (athlete) (born 1992), Kazakhstani athlete

T
Tatiana Grigorieva (born 1975), Russian/Australian pole vaulter
Tatiana P. Grigorieva (1929–2014), Russian Japanologist

V
Vassili Grigorjev (1870–?), Russian-Estonian politician

Y
Yury Grigoriev (born 1969), Russian politician

Bulgarian-language surnames
Russian-language surnames
Patronymic surnames
Surnames from given names